Rugby union has been played at the Asian Games since the 1998 games in Bangkok, Thailand. In the 1998 and 2002 editions of the games, both the usual fifteen-a-side variety and rugby sevens were played, but from 2006 onwards, only rugby sevens was retained. In 2010, the women's rugby sevens event was introduced. The event is likely to remain a permanent fixture of the Asian Games due to elevation of rugby sevens as an Olympic sport from the 2016 Olympics onwards.

Summary

Men's union

Men's sevens

Women's sevens

Medal table

Participating nations

Men's union

Men's sevens

Women's sevens

List of medalists

References

External links
Medallists from previous Asian Games - Rugby

 
Rugby sevens
Rugby union at multi-sport events
Rugby sevens competitions in Asia
Rugby union competitions in Asia for national teams